Ira J. Westover (1795 – March 27, 1836) was an officer in the Texian Army who served in the Texas Revolution, leading a force of Texian riflemen during the Battle of Lipantitlán. He and his adopted son were killed in the Goliad Massacre.

Early life
Ira Westover was born in Massachusetts.

Texas Revolution

Death

References 

1795 births
1836 deaths
Army of the Republic of Texas officers
Military personnel killed in action
People who died in the Goliad Massacre